Wildwood Hall is a historic house on Moore's Hill Road in Newbury, Vermont.  Also known locally as The Castle, it is a distinctive example of Shingle style architecture, designed as a country house by William M. Butterfield and completed in 1895.  It was listed on the National Register of Historic Places in 1978.

Description and history
Wildwood Hall stands in southeastern Newbury, on a hillside overlooking the Connecticut River valley to the east and south.  It is set on the north side of Moore's Hill Road, on an  parcel that is formally landscaped in the immediate vicinity of the house.  The house is a -story, its first floor built out of uncoursed fieldstone, and its upper levels framed in wood and clad in wooden shingles.  The main block is covered by a gabled roof, while the crossing ell has a gambrel roof.  At the crook of the ell, a round tower with conical roof rises above a squared porch supported by fieldstone columns.  The interior retains original Queen Anne woodwork, and a mosaic marble floor in its main floor.

The house was built between 1893 and 1895, for George Moore, on a site that was documented as early as 1799 for its magnificent views of the river valley.  It was designed by William M. Butterfield of Manchester, New Hampshire, who had a reputation for high-quality Queen Anne and Shingle style designs.  Moore lived here until his death in 1905.

See also
National Register of Historic Places listings in Orange County, Vermont

References

Houses on the National Register of Historic Places in Vermont
National Register of Historic Places in Orange County, Vermont
Shingle Style architecture in Vermont
Houses completed in 1893
Houses in Orange County, Vermont
Buildings and structures in Newbury, Vermont